The Railways Act 1921 (c. 55), also known as the Grouping Act, was an Act of Parliament enacted by the British government and intended to stem the losses being made by many of the country's 120 railway companies, by "grouping" them into four large companies dubbed the "Big Four". This was intended to move the railways away from internal competition, and retain some of the benefits which the country had derived from a government-controlled railway during and after the Great War of 1914–1918. The provisions of the Act took effect from the start of 1923.

History
The British railway system had been built up by more than a hundred railway companies, large and small, and often, particularly locally, in competition with each other. The parallel railways of the East Midlands and the rivalry between the South Eastern Railway and the London, Brighton and South Coast Railway at Hastings were two examples of such local competition.

During the First World War the railways were under state control, which continued until 1921. Complete nationalisation had been considered, and the 1921 Act is sometimes considered as a precursor to that, but the concept was rejected; nationalisation was subsequently carried out after the Second World War, under the Transport Act 1947.

The form of the Act was developed by former North Eastern Railway executive, the Minister of Transport, Eric Geddes. Geddes favoured privately owned regional monopolies through amalgamations, and suggested increased worker participation from pre-war levels. Geddes viewed the pre-war competition as wasteful, but was opposed to nationalisation on the grounds that it led to poor management, as well as a mutually corrupting influence between railway and political interests. In his 9 March 1920 Cabinet paper "Future Transport Policy", he proposed five English groups (Southern, Western, North Western, Eastern and North Eastern), a London passenger group, and separate single groupings for Scotland and Ireland.

Geddes' proposals became the 1920 white paper "Outline of Proposals as to the Future Organisation of Transport Undertakings in Great Britain and their Relation to the State" (Cmd. 787). This suggested the formation of six or seven regional companies; additionally it suggested worker participation on the board of directors of the company. The white paper was opposed by the Railway Companies' Association (RCA) and MPs representing railway companies' interests. The move to greater worker participation was strongly opposed by the RCA, but supported by the Labour Party. Worker-directors were not included in the final act, being replaced by agreed negotiating mechanisms.

In 1921, the white paper "Memorandum on Railways Bill" (Cmd. 1292) suggested four English regional groups and two Scottish groups.

Scottish railway companies wished to be incorporated into British groupings, and the RCA proposed five British regional monopolies including the Scottish businesses.

After consideration of the Railways Bill, it was decided that the Scottish companies, originally destined to be a separate group, would be included with the Midland/North Western and Eastern groups respectively, in order that the three main Anglo-Scottish trunk routes should each be owned by one company for its full length: the West Coast Main Line and the Midland Main Line by the former group, and the East Coast Main Line by the latter.

The Act
The opening paragraph of the Railways Act of 1921 states:

With a view to the reorganisation and more efficient and economical working of the railway system of Great Britain railways shall be formed into groups in accordance with the provisions of this Act, and the principal railway companies in each group shall be amalgamated, and other companies absorbed in manner provided by this Act.

Part 1 of the act dealt with the terms and procedure of the amalgamations of railway companies. The constituents and subsidiaries of the four groups were set out in the first schedule of the act. Companies that had not formed an amalgamation scheme by 1923 would be amalgamated under terms decided by a tribunal.

Part 2 dealt with powers and regulation of the railway companies by the Railway and Canal Commission, part 3 dealt with railway rates, charges and conditions of carriage with powers given to a Railway Rates Tribunal, and part 4 with employee wages and conditions.

Parts 5 and 6 dealt with light railways and general clauses respectively, with the general clauses of part 6 including the requirement of the railway companies to provide the Minister of Transport with statistic and financial reports.

The third reading of the Act in the House of Commons took place on 9 August 1921, and was passed with a majority of 237 to 62; the act passed through the House of Lords and the Lords' amendments were accepted by the Commons on 19 August and Royal Assent given. The state control of the railways which began under war conditions during World War I were to continue under the Ministry of Transport Act 1919 for a further two years.

The Act took effect on 1 January 1923. On that date most of the mergers took place; some had taken place during the previous year. The February 1923 issue of The Railway Magazine dubbed the new companies as "The Big Four of the New Railway Era".

Lines outside the Act
A number of joint railways remained outside the Big Four, continuing to be operated jointly by the successor companies. These included the Midland and Great Northern Joint Railway (M&GN), a London, Midland and Scottish Railway/London and North Eastern Railway joint line in eastern England, the largest of the joint railways in terms of route mileage; the Cheshire Lines Committee (CLC), LMS/LNER joint line in Lancashire and Cheshire, largest in terms of both passenger and freight traffic; and the Somerset and Dorset Joint Railway (S&DJR), a joint LMS/SR line in south-western England.

The London suburban railway companies, such as the Underground Electric Railways Company of London and the Metropolitan Railway, were also excluded. Later legislation under the London Passenger Transport Act 1933 amalgamated these and London area bus and tram operations into the London Passenger Transport Board (see List of transport undertakings transferred to the London Passenger Transport Board).

Other exempted railways were light railways authorised under the Light Railways Act 1896, and similar lines, although some such lines still chose to join the groups. Those lines staying independent were principally those under the influence of Colonel Stephens, who had been instrumental in securing the necessary exemption.

See also
UK enterprise law
List of railway companies involved in the 1923 Grouping
UK labour law
History of rail transport in Great Britain 1923–1947
The four groups listed in the act, later known as the "Big Four" companies:
 The Southern Group, see Southern Railway (SR)
 The Western Group, see Great Western Railway (GWR)
 The North Western, Midland, and West Scottish Group, see London, Midland and Scottish Railway (LMS)
 The North Eastern, Eastern, and East Scottish Group, see London and North Eastern Railway (LNER)

Notes

References

E McGaughey, 'Votes at Work in Britain: Shareholder Monopolisation and the ‘Single Channel’ (2018) 47(1) Industrial Law Journal 76

External links
, retrospective on Railway Gazette articles relating to the grouping

Railway Acts
1921 in law
United Kingdom Acts of Parliament 1921
1921 in rail transport
Transport policy in the United Kingdom
August 1921 events